Pristoceraea is a monotypic moth genus of the family Noctuidae described by Ferdinand Karsch in 1895. Its only species, Pristoceraea eriopis, was first described by Gottlieb August Wilhelm Herrich-Schäffer in 1853. It is found on Madagascar.

References

Agaristinae
Monotypic moth genera